"Goodbye on a Bad Day" is a debut song co-written and recorded by American country music artist Shannon Lawson.  It was released in February 2002 as the first single from the album Chase the Sun.  The song reached #28 on the Billboard Hot Country Singles & Tracks chart.  The song was written by Lawson and Mark A. Peters.

Critical reception
Deborah Evans Price of Billboard reviewed the song favorably. She described Lawson's vocal as "letting disappointment drip...like icy regret" before "totally unleashing" on the chorus. Price's review also praised the lyrics and "deft production".

Chart performance

References

2002 debut singles
2002 songs
Shannon Lawson songs
Songs written by Shannon Lawson
Song recordings produced by Mark Wright (record producer)
MCA Nashville Records singles